The County Connection (officially, the Central Contra Costa Transit Authority, CCCTA) is a Concord-based public transit agency operating fixed-route bus and ADA paratransit (County Connection LINK) service in and around central Contra Costa County in the San Francisco Bay Area. Established in 1980 as a joint powers authority, CCCTA assumed control of public bus service within central Contra Costa first begun by Oakland-based AC Transit as it expanded into suburban Contra Costa County in the mid-1970s (especially after the opening of BART).

History 
In March 1980, the Central Contra Costa Transit Authority was created by a joint powers agreement between the cities of Clayton, Concord, Lafayette, Martinez, Pleasant Hill, Walnut Creek, the town of Moraga, and the County of Contra Costa. Upon their incorporation, the town of Danville and the city of San Ramon also joined CCCTA. CCCTA is governed by a board of directors, with a representative appointed from each of its member cities and the county. Day-to-day operations are overseen by the General Manager.

On July 1, 1980, CCCTA began service, with its first route serving Walnut Creek. The changeover from AC Transit to County Connection was somewhat gradual, with County Connection assuming the remainder of the service by 1982.

Fixed-route service 
As of May 2020, the County Connection operates 25 weekday routes (three of which also operate on weekends), seven weekend-only routes, and 19 school tripper routes within central Contra Costa County. All routes, with the exception of some of the 600-numbered series select service trips, connect with regional train service, primarily BART, in addition to ACE in Pleasanton and Amtrak, including Amtrak California's Capitol Corridor and San Joaquin services in Martinez. Among its 30 weekday routes, the County Connection operates seven express routes (Routes 91X—98X). With support from the city of Walnut Creek, the County Connection also operates a free downtown circulator with trolley livery (Route 4) with service between Walnut Creek and Broadway Plaza.

Major points of interest in the area served by the County Connection include:

 Diablo Valley College in Pleasant Hill
 Diablo Valley College, San Ramon Valley Campus, in San Ramon Route 35
 Cal State East Bay in Concord Route 93X and 260
 Sunvalley Mall in Concord Routes 9, 18,19, 20, 98X, 314, and 316
 Broadway Plaza in Walnut Creek  Route 4
 Saint Mary's College of California in Moraga Routes 6 and 250
 Bishop Ranch Business Park in San Ramon Routes 21, 35, 36, 95X, 96X, 97X, and 321

Route overview

Weekdays 
Weekday service is provided on all routes except 300-numbered series routes, which operate only on weekends. 600-numbered series routes are select service trips convenient to area schools and operate on school days, with service timed to school bell times.

Weekends 
Service is provided on the following 11 routes:

Fixed-route fleet 

The current fixed-route fleet consists of 135 wheelchair-accessible buses manufactured by Gillig. Each bus is accessible by a ramp and has space for two wheelchairs. Buses feature Clever Devices GPS-based automatic voice annunciation (AVA) and visual next-stop announcements.  Each bus has the capacity for two bicycles on a front bumper-mounted rack, with an additional two bicycles permitted aboard at the bus operator's discretion.

References

External links 
 

Bus transportation in California
Public transportation in Contra Costa County, California
Transit agencies in California